John William Dunlop (April 23, 1874 – April 7, 1957) was an American football player and coach. He served as the fifth head football coach at Boston College, coaching four seasons between 1897 and 1901 and compiling a record of 16–16–2. Boston College did not field a football team in 1900.

In 1922, Dunlop was residing in Boston, working as a real estate, mortgage and insurance broker. He was married to Alice Lillian Hall, whom he wed on October 25, 1899, and had two children, Lydia and John William, Jr.. He later entered in a partnership with Stephen W. Sleeper, a fellow Harvard alumnus, to form the real estate firm Sleeper & Dunlop.

He died at Westborough, Massachusetts in 1957.

Head coaching record

See also
 List of college football head coaches with non-consecutive tenure

References

1874 births
1957 deaths
19th-century players of American football
American football halfbacks
Boston College Eagles football coaches
Harvard Crimson football players
Sportspeople from Cambridge, Massachusetts